Neon Hunk was a husband/wife noise music duo from Milwaukee, composed of Jennifurmium (Mothmaster) - vocals and analog synthesizer/ring modulator, and Pink Diamond (Mossmaster) - Drums, Vocals, and Modular Digital Synthesizer. Neon Hunk formed in the summer of 2000 under the name Abracadaver, but changed their name to Neon Hunk in 2001. Neon Hunk disbanded in 2004. Both members of Neon Hunk have continued to record music independently after halting activity with the band.

The music of Neon Hunk featured sparse, drum and synthesizer arrangements, generally non-tonal, and often in non-standard and frequently changing time signatures. Neon Hunk's vocals were processed with a vocoder with a noise source as the carrier, and were often likened to the sound of a cougar.

Their sound combined aspects of progressive and experimental rock, punk, avant-garde electronic/noise music, and at times, free-improvisation. The music is held together with a quirky, cartoonish pop sensibility. Typical Neon Hunk songs rarely exceeded two minutes, though live shows sometimes featured longer improvised jam-sessions (as documented on their tape-only release Neyan Honkies and the self-released tour only release, SECRETS OF THE HUNK).

Neon Hunk sited diverse influences including Black Sabbath, Melvins, Ruins, Rush, Blue Cheer, early Devo, and Kraftwerk, as well as musical contemporaries such as many of their Load Records peers and many other artists within the underground noise and punk community.

The twosome was known for their lively, high energy shows, disjointed dance moves, and scrapped-together, bright, home-modified masks and costumes.

Neon Hunk toured the US and Canada several times in summers and winters from 2001 to 2003 including partial or whole tours with Hair Police, Mammal, Wolf Eyes, The Locust, Chinese Stars, Kites, and Black Coitus Family.

Neon Hunk's final performance was in 2004 at the De Stijl festival in Minneapolis, MN alongside The Dream Aktion Unit (Thurston Moore/Chris Corsano/Paul Flaherty/Jim O’Rourke), Devendra Banhart, Wooden Wand and the Vanishing Voice, Dead Machines,  and other noise/freak weirdos.

Since the dissolution of Neon Hunk, Mossmaster and Mothmaster have continued recording music under various names. Mossmaster has self-released several solo CDr's, and as of 2009 is working on a full-length album and recording music for various film and video related media.

Discography

AbraCadaver 7-inch EP (Liquid Death/Hello Pussy Records 2001)
Split 7-inch EP with My Name is Rar Rar (Liquid Death/Hello Pussy Records 2002)
SECRETS OF THE HUNK (Self-Released tour only release - two versions with different packaging 2002 & 2003)
Neyan Honkies Cassette (Heresee 2002)
Smarmymob (Load Records 2003)
Split 10-inch EP as Crystal Fantasy with Hair Police (Liquid Death/Hello Pussy Records ??)

References

American noise rock music groups
Load Records artists